Maurin of the Moors (French: Maurin des Maures) is a 1932 French comedy film directed by André Hugon and starring Antonin Berval, Jean Aquistapace and Nicole Vattier. It is based on Jean Aicard's 1908 novel of the same name.

Cast
 Antonin Berval as Maurin  
 Jean Aquistapace as Pastoure  
 Nicole Vattier as Tonia  
 Jeanne Boitel as Madame Labarterie  
 Rivers Cadet as Sandri  
 Camille Bert as Brig. Orsini  
 Émile Dehelly as Cabissol  
 Pierre Finaly as Labarterie  
 Paul Menant as Célestin Grondard  
 José Davert as Grondard  
 Geo Georgey as Grivolas  
 Guillaumin as Lecorps  
 Grinda as Saulnier 
 Délia Col 
 Janine Maubant

References

Bibliography 
 Dayna Oscherwitz & MaryEllen Higgins. The A to Z of French Cinema. Scarecrow Press, 2009.

External links 
 

1932 films
1932 comedy films
French comedy films
1930s French-language films
Films directed by André Hugon
French black-and-white films
1930s French films